Peter Baxter (born 4 July 1961) is a former Australian rules footballer who represented the Footscray Football Club in the Victorian Football League (VFL) during the 1980s.

Baxter played only one game in his debut season, before having a strong second season, playing 16 games for the Dogs. Baxter managed only 6 more games over the next two seasons before leaving the club at the end of 1988.

References

1961 births
Living people
Western Bulldogs players
Australian rules footballers from Victoria (Australia)